Synthlipsis is a genus of flowering plants belonging to the family Brassicaceae.

Its native range is Texas to Northeastern Mexico.

Species:

Synthlipsis densiflora 
Synthlipsis greggii

References

Brassicaceae
Brassicaceae genera